Joseph French, known professionally as Joey French, is an American record producer and recording engineer from Indianapolis, IN.  French gained recognition for producing on Warner Bros signee Waka Flocka Flame's debut album, Flockaveli.

Life and career 
In 2010, French produced the bonus track "Rumors" on Flockaveli by Waka Flocka Flame.  In 2015, French was the executive producer of Every Scar Has A Story by Dorian.

Personal life 
French owns the production company JoHoSoPhat Productions located in Indianapolis, IN. French names hip-hop producer Timbaland as his primary influence.

Production credits 
 2010: Waka Flocka Flame - "Rumors" from Flockaveli
 2011: [ Ryan McDaniel] - "Naive"
 2015: Dorian - "Sex God" feat. G. Martin from Every Scar Has A Story
 2015: Dorian - Every Scar Has A Story (co-executive producer)
 2016: [ Trajik ] "Country Time"
 2017: [ The Combine/CBS Sports Making Of A Pro QB ] "Dime City"
 2017: [ Mark Battles] "Penny" from Day 2
 2018: [ Mark Battles] "Here We Go Again" from  Vasi World 
 2018: [ Trajik ] "Traptown,USA" 
 2018: [ Mike Eazy BEazy ] "Complacent" 
 2018: [ Ceejay 2 Kold ] "Whole Lotta"
 2018: [ Fox Network ] "Bad As It Get's"  Star 
 2019: [ Fox Network ] "Jalen Ramsey Documentary" "All Good"

References 

Living people
Indiana University alumni
American hip hop record producers
Musicians from Indianapolis
Year of birth missing (living people)